Round Island or Pak Sha Chau is an uninhabited island of Hong Kong. Administratively, it is part of the North District.

See also

 Mirs Bay

Uninhabited islands of Hong Kong
North District, Hong Kong
Islands of Hong Kong